is a Japanese writer. She has won the Mishima Yukio Prize, the Japan Fantasy Novel Award, and the Oda Sakunosuke Prize.

Early life and education 
Koyata was born in Abiko, Chiba, Japan in 1981. In junior high school she initially participated in the softball club, then quit group activities and refused to go to school, instead spending time reading at the local library. Koyata later returned to school and eventually graduated from Nishogakusha University in Tokyo. After graduation she worked in temporary jobs and began writing her first novel.

Career 
The novel  followed the next year.

In 2016 Koyata's book , a story about sexuality and discrimination set in a near future society, won the 34th Oda Sakunosuke Prize. Release was also nominated for the 30th Mishima Yukio Prize, but the prize went to Yusuke Miyauchi. That same year Koyata's book , a story about relationships and sexuality in the life of a fifteen year old girl set in a fantasy society in which animals and people are family, was published by Shinchosha. Nozomu no wa won the 17th Sense of Gender Awards Grand Prize. 

In 2018 Mugen no gen was published in a book along with the story , which was nominated for the 159th Akutagawa Prize.

Recognition
 2013 Japan Fantasy Novel Award
 2017 34th Oda Sakunosuke Prize
 2018 31st Mishima Yukio Prize
 2018 17th Sense of Gender Awards Grand Prize

Bibliography
 , Shinchosha, 2013, 
 , Shinchosha, 2014, 
 , Kobunsha, 2016, 
 , Shinchosha, 2017, 
 , Chikuma Shobō, 2018, 
 , Kawade Shobō, 2019,

References

1981 births
Living people
21st-century Japanese novelists
21st-century Japanese women writers
Japanese women novelists
Writers from Chiba Prefecture
Yukio Mishima Prize winners
People from Abiko, Chiba